Ernest D'Israeli Smith (December 8, 1853 – October 15, 1948) was a Canadian businessman and politician who founded a food company that bears his name.

Life
He was born in the hamlet of Winona, part of Saltfleet Township (which became Stoney Creek) on Ontario's Niagara Peninsula. His wife, Christina Ann Smith, was the first president of the Women’s Institute in Stoney Creek, which was also organized by Adelaide Hoodless and Erland and Janet Lee.

In his mature years, Smith relied on his sons to spearhead new business ventures. An expansion to Britain was foiled by the start of the First World War, and continued fruit sales in Canada were reduced by the Great Depression of the 1930s. Consequently, the company concentrated on tomato production for export since it was more of a staple than fruit.

His farms were a place where women worked during the First World War as part of the Women's Work on the Land program. This program brought female university students onto farms during the summer to help with food production.

After the start of the Second World War, E.D. Smith & Sons Ltd. acquired the Canadian rights to H.P. Sauce Ltd. of Britain and in 1948 the latter's subsidiary Lea & Perrins Ltd. On October 15, 1948, E.D. Smith died. The private company bearing his name was sold to Imperial Capital in 2001. In October 2007 it became a wholly owned subsidiary of TreeHouse Foods, Inc. Its current product line includes jams & spreads, syrups, pie fillings, ketchup, sauces, and salad dressings.

The E.D. Smith archives and collection (family and factory) is currently housed in the Erland Lee Museum in Stoney Creek

Political career
Smith was elected to the House of Commons of Canada as the Conservative Member of Parliament (MP) for Wentworth South in 1900. Under redistribution, four years later Smith was re-elected as MP for the combined constituency of Wentworth which covered all of Wentworth County outside Hamilton. He won a by-election in 1905.

Smith was appointed to the Senate in 1913, and served until he resigned in 1946 just two years before his death.

References

External links

E. D. Smith Foods, Ltd., corporate site
Treehouse Foods, Inc., corporate site
Agricultural History pay-per-read scholarly article

1853 births
1948 deaths
Businesspeople from Ontario
Canadian senators from Ontario
Conservative Party of Canada (1867–1942) MPs
Conservative Party of Canada (1867–1942) senators
Members of the House of Commons of Canada from Ontario
Politicians from Hamilton, Ontario